Lorena Klijn (born September 20, 1987) is a Dutch kickboxer who competes in the flyweight and bantamweight divisions.

Career
Lorena Klijn rose to prominence by winning the World Professional Kickboxing League (WPKL) Women's World Flyweight Championship and garnering an unbeaten record of 17-0. She challenged for another world title on March 19, 2011 when she took on Alexis Rufus for the IKF Women's World Bantamweight (-55.45 kg/122.2 lb) Muay Thai title in London, England. The first two rounds were close but Rufus began to pull away in the third and inflicted Klijn's first defeat by unanimous decision. She then also lost by decision in her next two fights, to Jemyma Betrian at Klaar Om Te Bossen 3 in Paramaribo, Suriname on December 23, 2011 and to Ilsury Hendrikse at Haarlem Fight Night III in Haarlem, Netherlands on February 26, 2012.

Klijn made the switch to shoot boxing later that year when she was recruited to compete in the 2012 Shoot Boxing Girls S-Cup in Tokyo, Japan on August 25, 2012. In what was named as a contender for LiverKick.com's "Upset of the Year", she defeated Erika Kamimura by unanimous decision after an extension round was needed to separate the pair in their quarter-final match. Kamimura had a slight edge in the striking, but Klijn used the clinch to her advantage and was able to score a shoot point in the extension round which was the difference. She again went to an extension round in the semis with Mei Yamaguchi but came out on the losing end of a unanimous decision this time. Both fighters looked to use their clinch game to advance, but Yamaguchi proved to be superior in that department, scoring a shoot point in the second round and two shoot points in the extension round, as well as a yellow card to Klijn, which secured the lopsided extension round win.

She made her return to shoot boxing in a 53.5 kg/118 lb bout at Shootboxing 2013: Act 2 on April 20, 2013, and took a majority decision win over Miyo Yoshida. Klijn then rematch Mei Yamaguchi at Shootboxing 2013: Act 3 on June 23, 2013. She scored two shoot points in round one by executing a suplex but twisted her ankle in round two. She fought on nonetheless and continued to score with knees throughout round three and won by unanimous decision.

In a -50 kg/110 lb non-tournament bout during the 2013 Shoot Boxing Girls S-Cup Japan Midsummer Festival on August 3, 2013, Klijn lost to Rena Kubota by majority decision following an extension round. Rena managed to avoid the Dutchwoman's haymakers and attempted an arm triangle choke in round three, but Klijn also had success with throws and knees from the clinch and thus the bout was called a majority draw after the regulation three rounds. In the decisive round, Rena picked up the pace and scored throughout with punch-kick combinations to take the judges' decision.

Klijn lost to Iman Barlow by UD at -54 kg/119 lb Enfusion Live 15 in Dublin, Ireland on March 22, 2014.

Championships and awards

Kickboxing
World Professional Kickboxing League
WPKL Women's World Flyweight Championship

Kickboxing record

|-
|-  bgcolor="#CCFFCC"
| 2014-11-21 || Win ||align=left| Mellony Geugjes|| Enfusion 34 || Groningen, The Netherlands || Extension round decision(unanimous) || 4 || 3:00 || 21-6
|-
|-  bgcolor="#FFBBBB"
| 2014-03-22 || Loss ||align=left| Iman Barlow || Enfusion Live 15 || Dublin, Ireland || Decision (unanimous) || 3 || 3:00 || 20-6
|-
|-  bgcolor="#FFBBBB"
| 2013-08-03 || Loss ||align=left| Rena Kubota || 2013 Shoot Boxing Girls S-Cup Japan Midsummer Festival || Tokyo, Japan || Extension round decision (majority) || 4 || 3:00 || 20-5
|-
|-  bgcolor="#CCFFCC"
| 2013-06-23 || Win ||align=left| Mei Yamaguchi || Shootboxing 2013: Act 3 || Tokyo, Japan || Decision (unanimous) || 3 || 3:00 || 20-4
|-
|-  bgcolor="#CCFFCC"
| 2013-04-20 || Win ||align=left| Miyo Yoshida || Shootboxing 2013: Act 2 || Tokyo, Japan || Decision (majority) || 3 || 3:00 || 19-4
|-
|-  bgcolor="#FFBBBB"
| 2012-08-25 || Loss ||align=left| Mei Yamaguchi || 2012 Shoot Boxing Girls S-Cup, Semi Finals || Tokyo, Japan || Decision (unanimous) || 3 || 2:00 || 18-4
|-
|-  bgcolor="#CCFFCC"
| 2012-08-25 || Win ||align=left| Erika Kamimura || 2012 Shoot Boxing Girls S-Cup, Quarter Finals || Tokyo, Japan || Extension round decision (unanimous) || 4 || 2:00 || 18-3
|-
|-  bgcolor="#FFBBBB"
| 2012-02-26 || Loss ||align=left| Ilsury Hendrikse || Haarlem Fight Night III || Haarlem, Netherlands || Decision || 3 || 3:00 || 17-3
|-
|-  bgcolor="#FFBBBB"
| 2011-12-23 || Loss ||align=left| Jemyma Betrian || Klaar Om Te Bossen 3 || Paramaribo, Suriname || Decision || 3 || 3:00 || 17-2
|-
|-  bgcolor="#FFBBBB"
| 2011-03-19 || Loss ||align=left| Alexis Rufus || Championship Muay Thai || London, England || Decision (unanimous) || 5 || 3:00 || 17-1
|-
! style=background:white colspan=9 |
|-
|-  bgcolor="#CCFFCC"
| 2011-02-20 || Win ||align=left| Samantha van Doorn || Haarlem Fight Night II || Haarlem, Netherlands || || || || 
|-
|-  bgcolor="#CCFFCC"
| 2009-00-00 || Win ||align=left| Ana Isabel Sordo || || Spain || KO (left knee) || 1 || 1:39 || 
|-
|-  bgcolor="#CCFFCC"
| 2007-04-28 || Win ||align=left| Linda Sijbesma || Muay Boran Gym Gala || Deventer, Netherlands || Decision || 3 || 3:00 || 
|-
|-
| colspan=9 | Legend:

References

External links
 Official Shoot Boxing profile
 Awakening profile

1987 births
Living people
Bantamweight kickboxers
Dutch female kickboxers
Flyweight kickboxers
Sportspeople from Groningen (city)
Sportspeople from Haarlem
20th-century Dutch women
21st-century Dutch women